EduKey (BellAmos) School is a private, co-educational day school for grades K-9 located in Martin, Slovakia. EduKey (BellAmos) is a member of the Slovak National Association of Independent Schools, educating students from all across the Žilina area from nursery school to the ninth grade. It also hosts international students coming from various parts of the world (Great Britain, South Africa, Germany etc.)  It is Slovak's oldest independent school.

In 2011 the Ministry of Education of Slovakia ranked BellAmos among the top 5% of all elementary schools in Slovakia according to the National examination MONITOR.

History
EduKey was officially accredited by the ministry of Education of the Slovak Republic on January 1, 1996. It welcomed its first pupils on September 1, 1996. The school was back then headquartered in the building of the Letrich Gymnasium, it moved from there in 1998 into the building of the Sklabiňa Elementary school in Sklabiňa, a village close to Martin. In 2000 the school bought its own buildings in Martin and moved a final time.

Organization

Mission

Currently, the school teaches students in grades K-9. The school's mission is the following: EduKey (BellAmos) strives to educate each student to reach his highest level of intellectual, ethical, artistic, and physical development. Drawing on what is known about students growth and learning, the school offers a rigorous K-9 program rich in opportunities for cultivating individual talents and interests in a climate of collaboration and respect.

Campus

The campus, located on Východná 11441/18B, consists of three separate buildings: The Main Building, the Cafeteria and the Gym building. All three buildings border a courtyard where students of all grades play various games.

Structure
Each class has around 15 students. 

The school is private, and it functions under a Slovakian non-profit statute. BellAmos is controlled by a board of trustees, and the school is administered by the Headmasters department, internally by the Headmaster and externally by the Chief Operating Manager and the Headmaster.

Academics
Students at  level one (K-5) are required to study Slovak, one foreign language (English), Mathematics, Computer Science, Biology, Geography, World and Slovak History, Communication studies, Civics, Arts, Classical Music Studies and Physical Education. Students must go beyond these basic requirements in at least some, if not all, subjects.

Students at  level two (grade 6-9) are required to study Slovak, two foreign languages (English, German), Mathematics, Computer Science, Biology, Geography, Chemistry, Physics, World and Slovak History, Civics, Government Studies, Philosophy,   Arts, Classical Music Studies and Physical Education.

The school has a working international partnership program with two elementary schools located in Czech Republic and Poland. Allowing its students a development in their multicultural understanding.

Student life
Co-curricular include clubs that provide the students with an opportunity to produce publications, hone their debating skills, participate in activism and much more. Among the many clubs are:

Journalistic Club
Photography
Ecology and Touristic 
Gymnastics 
Soccer Club
Floor ball Club 
Ski Club
etc.

EduKey (BellAmos), through its Journalistic department and its own TAK (TABA) news agency publishes a school Newsletter called Kľúčik (Zvonček). 
It is highly regarded and holds two Jozef Flak awards for outstanding Newsletter quality.

Other activities
Since the schools founding it has been a tradition to host annual Musicals. For grade one to grade 9 there is also a mandatory one week camping trip that usually takes place in one of Slovaks national parks, it provides students with basic understanding of Ecology, First Aid and Surviving skills in the Country.

Education in Slovakia
Schools in Slovakia
Educational institutions established in 1996
Martin, Slovakia
Buildings and structures in Žilina Region
1996 establishments in Slovakia